Sam Wallace may refer to:

 Sam Wallace (netball)
 Sam Wallace (journalist)

See also
 Samantha Wallace (disambiguation) 
 Samuel Wallace (1892–1968), Scottish recipient of the Victoria Cross